Randolph Galloway (22 December 1896 – 10 April 1964) was an English footballer and football manager. He played for Sunderland Tramways, Derby County, Nottingham Forest, Luton Town, Coventry City, Tottenham Hotspur and Grantham Town.

Galloway scored on his 'Lilywhites' debut in a 1–1 draw with Southampton at The Dell in September 1928 in the old Second Division.

Management
Galloway coached Sporting de Gijón, Valencia CF, Racing de Santander, Peñarol, Young Fellows Zürich, Sporting CP and Vitória S.C.

References

External links
Biography

1896 births
1964 deaths
Footballers from Sunderland
English Football League players
English footballers
English expatriate sportspeople in Spain
English expatriate sportspeople in Switzerland
English expatriate sportspeople in Portugal
English expatriate sportspeople in Costa Rica
Derby County F.C. players
Nottingham Forest F.C. players
Luton Town F.C. players
Coventry City F.C. players
Tottenham Hotspur F.C. players
Grantham Town F.C. players
English football managers
Sporting de Gijón managers
Valencia CF managers
Racing de Santander managers
Sporting CP managers
Peñarol managers
SC Young Fellows Juventus managers
Vitória S.C. managers
Costa Rica national football team managers
Expatriate football managers in Portugal
Expatriate football managers in Spain
Expatriate football managers in Switzerland
Expatriate football managers in Costa Rica
Association football forwards